Mohammad Waqas (born 14 December 1990) is a Pakistani first-class cricketer who plays for Karachi Blues.

References

External links
 

1990 births
Living people
Pakistani cricketers
Habib Bank Limited cricketers
Karachi Blues cricketers
Karachi Whites cricketers
Sui Southern Gas Company cricketers
Cricketers from Karachi